We're Living' on Dog Food is a 2009 Australian documentary about the Melbourne underground music scene of 1977–81, including the little band scene. It was directed by Richard Lowenstein.

Interviewees
 Philip Brophy
 Alannah Hill
 Rowland S. Howard
 Ollie Olsen
 Primitive Calculators

References

External links
We're Livin' on Dog Food at the IMDb.
We're Livin' on Dog Food at Oz Movies.
Review of film at Real Time.
Review of film at The Age.

2009 films
Australian documentary films
Films directed by Richard Lowenstein